Chumara (Sumara) is a rural locality (a village) in Kelteyevsky Selsoviet, Kaltasinsky District, Bashkortostan, Russia. The population was 148 as of 2010. There are 7 streets.

Geography 
Chumara is located 97 km south of Kaltasy (the district's administrative centre) by road. Novokhazino is the nearest rural locality.

References 

Rural localities in Kaltasinsky District